Lurin  is a quartier of Saint Barthélemy in the Caribbean.  It is east of Gustavia and is one of the larger quartiers on the island.

Populated places in Saint Barthélemy
Quartiers of Saint Barthélemy